Liziyuan is a station on Line 11 of the Shanghai Metro. It opened on December 31, 2009.

References

External links 
 

Railway stations in Shanghai
Line 11, Shanghai Metro
Shanghai Metro stations in Putuo District
Railway stations in China opened in 2009